The 2007 The Citadel Bulldogs football team represented The Citadel, The Military College of South Carolina in the 2007 NCAA Division I FCS football season.  Kevin Higgins served as head coach for the third season.  The Bulldogs played as members of the Southern Conference and played home games at Johnson Hagood Stadium.

Schedule

Ranking movements

References

Citadel
The Citadel Bulldogs football seasons
Citadel Bulldogs football